Nummi-Pusula is a former municipality of Finland. It was merged with Lohja on 1 January 2013. Its seat was in Nummi. Nummi-Pusula was formed in 1981 from the former municipalities Nummi and Pusula.

It was located in the province of Southern Finland and was part of the Uusimaa region. The municipality has a population of 
which 
is water. The population density is
.

The municipality was unilingually Finnish.

Villages
Prior to its consolidation into Lohja in 2013, Nummi-Pusula contained of the following villages:

Nummi villages
 Haarla, Hakula, Heijala, Heimola, Huhti, Hyrsylä, Hyvelä, Immola, Jakova, Järvenpää, Jättölä, Korkianoja, Kovela, Leppäkorpi, Luttula, Maikkala, Maskila, Mettula, Miemola, Millola, Mommola, Mäntsälä, Nummi, Näkkilä, Oinola, Oittila, Pakkala, Pälölä, Raatti, Remala, Retlahti, Röhkölä, Salo, Saukkola, Sierla, Sitarla, Tavola, Varttila and Vivola.

Pusula villages
 Ahonpää, Hattula, Hauhula, Herrala, Hirvijoki, Hyrkkölä, Hyönölä, Ikkala, Karisjärvi, Kaukela, Koisjärvi, Kärkölä, Marttila, Mäkkylä, Pusula, Radus, Seppälä, Suomela, Uusikylä, Viiala and Vörlö.

Politics
Results of the 2011 Finnish parliamentary election in Nummi-Pusula:

True Finns   25.8%
Centre Party   20.3%
Social Democratic Party   18.8%
National Coalition Party   18.0%
Left Alliance   7.0%
Green League   5.3%
Christian Democrats   2.1%
Swedish People's Party   0.8%

Twinnings
 Abja Parish, Estonia (2004)

References

External links

Municipality of Nummi-Pusula – Official website

Populated places established in 1981
Lohja
Former municipalities of Finland